Inopsis is a genus of moths in the family Erebidae. The genus was described by Felder in 1874.

Species
Inopsis catoxantha Felder, 1874
Inopsis modulata (H. Edwards, 1884)
Inopsis scylla (Druce, 1885)
Inopsis metella (Druce, 1885)
Inopsis funerea (Grote, 1883)

References

Lithosiina
Moth genera